Reading Foundation for Art is an English charity registered in 1974. Its main purpose is to build an art collection for the people of Reading, Berkshire.

History 
The foundation was formed in 1974 following a donation by an anonymous benefactor. The first trustees registered it as a charity with the stated aim of purchasing works of art or other objects of archaeological, historical or scientific interest for the benefit of the public. These works are held in the permanent collection of Reading Borough Council in Reading Museum. The foundation also acquires works by donation and provides part funding for purchases made directly by the museum.

Contents of the collection  
The Foundation now owns over one hundred and twenty works of art including
 Paintings by Mary Fedden, Paul Nash and Julian Trevelyan
 Sculptures by Maggi Hambling and John Tweed
 Prints by Wilhelmina Barns-Graham, Sir Peter Blake, Sir Terry Frost and John Piper
 Ceramics and photographic collections

References 

Charities based in Berkshire
Organizations established in 1974